Cut and Paste is a 2006 Egyptian film. After turning thirty, Gmilla's dreams of emigrating abroad have collapsed. She meets Youssef who is also thinking of traveling and they make a pact that they will help each other to emigrate more easily. But the plan goes in an unexpected direction.

Cast 
Sherif Mounir as Youssef
Hanan Tork as Gamila
Fathy Abdel Wahab
Sawsan Badr  	
Marwa Mahran
Hanan Metaweh

References

External links 
 IMDB listing

2000s Arabic-language films
2006 films
Egyptian comedy-drama films